Uncle Joe's Spirit House is an album by American jazz double bassist William Parker, which was recorded in 2010 and released on the on Centering label.

Reception

In his review for AllMusic, arwulf arwulf states "Bassist William Parker's exceptionally fine and friendly-to-listen-to album Uncle Joe's Spirit House has been warmly received as a comparatively "inside" listening experience, because unlike virtually anything else in his discography prior to its release in 2010, this is a study in organ combo jazz... with every recording he sends out into the world, William Parker's personal blend of spirituality, surreality, and musicality references every aspect of his—and our—existence" The All About Jazz review noted "Uncle Joe's Spirit House is a deeply personal offering from a musician whose role as a scene leader and social activist is as significant as his instrumental prowess".

Track listing
All compositions by William Parker
 "Uncle Joe's Spirit House" - 9:01
 "Jacques' Groove" - 2:13
 "Ennio's Tag" - 5:41
 "Document for LJ" - 10:44
 "Let's Go Down to the River" - 7:19
 "Buddha's Joy" - 8:47
 "The Struggle" - 8:46
 "Theme for the Tasters" - 7:47
 "Oasis" - 4:12

Personnel
William Parker - bass
Darryl Foster - tenor saxophone
Cooper-Moore - organ
Gerald Cleaver - drums

References

2010 albums
AUM Fidelity albums
William Parker (musician) albums